This is a list of buildings that are examples of the Art Deco architectural style in the United States.

Alabama

Alaska

Arizona

Arkansas

California

Colorado

Connecticut

Delaware

Florida

Georiga

Hawaii

Idaho

Illinois

Indiana

Iowa

Kansas

Kentucky

Louisiana

Maine

Maryland

Massachusetts

Michigan

Minnesota

Mississippi

Missouri

Montana

Nebraska

Nevada

New Hampshire

New Jersey

New Mexico

New York

North Carolina

North Dakota

Ohio

Oklahoma

Oregon

Pennsylvania

Rhode Island

South Carolina

South Dakota

Tennessee

Texas

Utah

Vermont

Virginia

Washington

Washington, D.C.

West Virginia

Wisconsin

Wyoming

See also
 List of Art Deco architecture
 List of New Deal sculpture

References 

 "Art Deco & Streamline Moderne Buildings." Roadside Architecture.com. Retrieved 2019-01-03.
 "Art Deco Society of Boston, Art Deco Architecture, Art Deco Information". Retrieved 2019-01-03.
 Cinema Treasures. Retrieved 2022-09-06
 "Court House Lover". Flickr. Retrieved 2022-09-06
 "The Encyclopedia of Arkansas History and Culture". Archived from the original on 2019-01-04. Retrieved 2019-01-04.
 "Historic Buildings of Connecticut". Historic Buildings of Connecticut. (September 25, 2012) Retrieved 2019-01-03.
 "New Deal Map". The Living New Deal. Retrieved 2020-12-25.
 "SAH Archipedia". Society of Architectural Historians. Retrieved 2021-11-21.

External links
 

 
Architecture lists
Art Deco architecture in the United States
Lists of buildings and structures in the United States